The Museo Lamborghini (or Lamborghini Museum) is an automobile museum owned and operated by Automobili Lamborghini S.p.A. in Sant'Agata Bolognese, Emilia-Romagna, Italy. The two-storey museum opened in 2001, and was renovated in June 2016 to provide exhibit space for more models. The goal of the museum is to cover all major milestones in the Lamborghini's history. For this purpose, the museum displays a family tree that shows all the models ever produced by the company. The current gallery contains iconic supercars such as the 350 GT and the Sesto Elemento, and one-off and concept cars such as the Veneno and the Miura concept.

See also
List of automobile museums

References

External links

Museo Lamborghini – part of the Lamborghini official site 

 Google Virtual Gallery Tour
Museo Lamborghini at WR7

Automobile museums in Italy
Lamborghini
Museums in Emilia-Romagna
Buildings and structures in the Metropolitan City of Bologna
Museums established in 2001
2001 establishments in Italy